India has a multi-party system. The Election Commission of India (ECI) accords recognition to the national level and the state level political parties based upon objective criteria. A recognised political party enjoys privileges like a reserved party symbol, free broadcast time on state-run television and radio, consultation in the setting of election dates, and giving input in setting electoral rules and regulations. Other political parties that wish to contest local, state or national elections are required to be registered by the Election Commission of India.  Registered Parties are upgraded as recognised National Party or State Party by the ECI if they meet the relevant criteria after a Lok Sabha or State legislative assembly election. The Recognised Party status is reviewed periodically by the ECI.

Before the amendment in 2016 (came into force with effect from 1 January 2014), if a political party failed to fulfill the criteria in the subsequent Lok Sabha or state legislative assembly election, they lost their status as a recognised Party. In 2016, the ECI announced that such a review would take place after two consecutive elections instead of every election. Therefore, a political party shall retain the recognised Party status even if they do not meet the criteria in the next election. However, if they fail to meet the criteria in the subsequent election following the next election, they would lose their status.

As per latest publication dated 23 September 2021 from Election Commission of India, the total number of parties registered was 2858, with 8 national parties, 54 state parties and 2796 unrecognised parties. All registered parties contesting elections need to choose a symbol from a list of available symbols offered by the EC. All 28 states of the country along with the union territories of Jammu and Kashmir, National Capital Territory of Delhi and Puducherry have elected governments unless President's rule is imposed under certain condition.

National parties
A registered party is recognised as a national party only if it fulfils any one of the three conditions listed below:

 The party win 2% of seats in the Lok Sabha from at least three different states.
 At a general election to Lok Sabha or Legislative Assembly, the party polls 6% of votes in any four or more states and in addition it wins four Lok Sabha seats.
 The party gets recognition as a state party in four states.

Parties with national party status pending

In December 2022, after Gujarat Legislative election, Aam Aadmi Party has fulfilled the criteria for being the 9th national party of India. It is in the middle of the process of getting the official recognition as the National Party by Election commission of India.

State parties
A registered party is recognised as a state party only if it fulfils any one of the five conditions listed below:

 A party should secure at least 6% of valid votes polled in an election to the state legislative assembly and win at least 2 seats in that state assembly.
 A party should secure at least 6% of valid votes polled in an election to Lok Sabha and win at least 1 seat in Lok Sabha.
 A party should win at least 3% of the total number of seats or a minimum of three seats in the Legislative Assembly, which ever is higher.
 A party should win at least one seat in the Lok Sabha for every 25 seats or any fraction thereof allotted to that State.
 Under the liberalised criteria, one more clause that it will be eligible for recognition as state party if it secures 8% or more of the total valid votes polled in the state.

Unrecognised parties

See also

 Lists of political parties
 Political Parties in Kerala
 List of communist parties in India

Notes

References

Praty State and State Presidents List

Further reading
 Subrata K. Mitra and V. B. Singh. 1999. Democracy and Social Change in India:  but parties have to be 70per of decision A Cross-Sectional Analysis of the National Electorate. New Delhi: Sage Publications.  (India HB)  (U.S. HB).
 Subrata K. Mitra, Mike Enskat, Clemens Spiess (eds.). 2004. Political Parties in South Asia. Greenwood: Praeger.
Political Parties, Democratic Politics II, Textbook in Political Science for Class X, NCERT

India